Mariano Ruiz is a paralympic athlete from Spain competing mainly in category T12 distance events.

Mariano competed in four Paralympics, winning three gold medals.  He first competed in the 1988 Summer Paralympics where he won two gold medals in the 1500m and 5000m both with new games records.  At his some games in 1992 he defended his 5000m gold with another new Games record but despite running almost the same time as four years earlier ended up in fourth in the 1500m.  His third games in 1996 would produce yet another fourth place, this time in the 5000m and at his last games in 2000 he failed to finish the marathon

References

External links
 

Paralympic athletes of Spain
Athletes (track and field) at the 1988 Summer Paralympics
Athletes (track and field) at the 1992 Summer Paralympics
Athletes (track and field) at the 1996 Summer Paralympics
Athletes (track and field) at the 2000 Summer Paralympics
Paralympic gold medalists for Spain
Spanish male middle-distance runners
Spanish male long-distance runners
Living people
Year of birth missing (living people)
Medalists at the 1988 Summer Paralympics
Medalists at the 1992 Summer Paralympics
Paralympic medalists in athletics (track and field)
Visually impaired middle-distance runners
Visually impaired long-distance runners
Paralympic middle-distance runners
Paralympic long-distance runners
20th-century Spanish people